The Bear River Massacre, or the Engagement on the Bear River, or the Battle of Bear River, or Massacre at Boa Ogoi, took place in present-day Franklin County, Idaho, on January 29, 1863. After years of skirmishes and food raids on farms and ranches, the United States Army attacked a Shoshone encampment gathered at the confluence of the Bear River and Battle Creek in what was then southeastern Washington Territory, near the present-day city of Preston. Colonel Patrick Edward Connor led a detachment of California Volunteers as part of the Bear River Expedition against Shoshone tribal chief Bear Hunter. Hundreds of Shoshone men, women, and children were killed near their lodges; the number of Shoshone victims reported by local settlers was higher than that reported by soldiers.

Early history and causes 

Cache Valley, originally called Seuhubeogoi (Shoshone for "Willow Valley"), was the traditional hunting ground for the Northwestern Shoshone. They gathered grain and grass seeds there, as well as fished for trout and hunted small game such as ground squirrel and woodchuck; and large game including buffalo, deer, and elk. This mountain valley had attracted fur trappers such as Jim Bridger and Jedediah Smith, who visited the region. Cache Valley was named for the trappers' practice of leaving stores of furs and goods (i.e., a cache) in the valley as a base for hunting in the surrounding mountain ranges.

So impressed were the trappers by the region that they recommended to Brigham Young that he consider the valley as a location for his settlement of Mormon pioneers. Instead, Young chose Salt Lake Valley. In the long term, Mormon settlers eventually moved to Cache Valley as well. As early as July 31, 1847, a 20-man delegation of Shoshone met with the Mormons to discuss their land claims in northern Utah.

Immigrant pressures causing Shoshone starvation 
The establishment of the California Trail and Oregon Trail, as well as the founding of Salt Lake City in 1847, brought the Shoshone people into regular contact with white colonists moving westward. By 1856, European Americans had established their first permanent settlements and farms in Cache Valley, starting at Wellsville, Utah, and gradually moving northward.

Brigham Young made the policy that Mormon settlers should establish friendly relations with the surrounding American Indian tribes. He encouraged their helping to "feed them rather than fight them". Despite the policy, the settlers were consuming significant food resources and taking over areas that pushed the Shoshone increasingly into areas of marginal food production. David H. Burr, Surveyor General of the Territory of Utah, reported in 1856 that the local Shoshone Indians complained that the Mormons used so much of the Cache Valley that the once abundant game no longer appeared. The foraging and hunting by settlers traveling on the western migration trails also took additional resources away from the Shoshone. As early as 1859, Jacob Forney, the Superintendent of Indian Affairs for the Territory of Utah, recognized the impact of migrants, writing, "The Indians...have become impoverished by the introduction of a white population". He recommended that an Indian Reservation be established in Cache Valley to protect essential resources for the Shoshone. His superiors at the United States Department of the Interior did not act on his proposal. Desperate and starving, the Shoshone attacked farms and cattle ranches for food, not just for revenge but also survival.

In the early spring of 1862, Utah Territorial Superintendent of Indian Affairs, James Duane Doty, spent four days in Cache Valley and reported: "The Indians have been in great numbers, in a starving and destitute condition. No provisions having been made for them, either as to clothing or provisions by my predecessors... The Indians condition was such-with the prospect that they would rob mail stations to sustain life." Doty purchased supplies of food and slowly doled it out. He suggested furnishing the Shoshone with livestock to enable them to become herders instead of beggars.

On July 28, 1862, John White discovered gold on Grasshopper Creek in southwestern Montana mountains. Soon, miners created a migration and supply trail right through the middle of Cache Valley, between this mining camp and Salt Lake City. The latter was the nearest significant trading source of goods and food in the area.

Outbreak of the Civil War 
When the American Civil War began in 1861, President Abraham Lincoln was concerned that California, which had just recently become a state, would be cut off from the rest of the Union. He ordered several regiments to be raised from the population of California to help protect mail routes and the communications lines of the West. Neither Lincoln nor the U.S. War Department quite trusted the Mormons of the Utah Territory to remain loyal to the Union, despite their leader Young's telegrams and assurances. The Utah War and Mountain Meadows massacre were still fresh in the minds of military planners. They worried that the Mormons' substantial militia might answer only to Young and not the federal government.

Col. Patrick Edward Connor was put in command of the 3rd California Volunteer Infantry Regiment and ordered to move his men to Utah, to protect the Overland Mail Route and keep peace in the region. Upon arriving in Utah, he established Camp Douglas (adjacent to the current location of the University of Utah) as the primary base of operations for his unit. It was within a few miles of the Mormon Temple construction site and downtown Great Salt Lake City.

Warnings and conflicts with Cache Valley settlers 
Several incidents in the summer and fall of 1862 led to the battle between Bear Hunter and Col. Connor. These incidents were related to broad struggles between indigenous peoples and European-American settlers over almost the entire United States west of the Mississippi River. The attention of most of the nation's population was focused on the Civil War in the eastern states. Some historians have overlooked these incidents because they occurred near the ill-defined boundary of two different territories: those of Washington and Utah. For example, for years, residents and officials believed Franklin and the area of conflict was part of the Utah Territory. Residents of Franklin sent elected representatives to the Utah Territorial Legislature; they were part of the politics of Cache County, Utah, until 1872 when a surveying team determined the community was in Idaho territory.

Pugweenee 
When a resident of Summit Creek (now Smithfield) found his horse missing, he accused a young Shoshone fishing in nearby Summit Creek of having stolen the animal. Robert Thornley, an English immigrant and first resident of Summit Creek, defended the young Indian and testified for him. Nonetheless, a jury of locals convicted him and hanged him for stealing the horse. Local history recorded the Shoshone's name as Pugweenee. Later information reveals that Pugweenee is the Shoshone word for "fish" and so the man may have been saying, "Look at my fish," or "I was just fishing." The young Indian man was the son of the local Shoshone chief. Within a few days, the Shoshone retaliated by killing a couple of young men of the Merrill family gathering wood in the nearby canyon.

Massacre near Fort Hall 

During the summer of 1859, a settler company of about 19 people from Michigan was traveling on the Oregon Trail near Fort Hall when they were attacked at night by people they assumed were local Shoshone. Several members of the company were killed by gunfire. The survivors took refuge along the Portneuf River, where they hid among the bullrushes and willow trees. Three days later, Lieutenant Livingston of Fort Walla Walla, leading a company of dragoons, met the survivors. He investigated the incident and documented what he called the brutality of the attack. According to the Deseret News of September 21, 1859, a detachment of Lieutenant Livingston's dragoons found five bodies at the scene of the massacre were mangled. A girl of only five years old had her ears cut off, her eyes gouged out, both legs amputated at the knees, and by all appearances, was made to walk on her stumps.

Reuben Van Ornum and the Battle of Providence 

On September 9, 1860, Elijah Utter was leading migrants on the Oregon trail when they were attacked by a group of presumably Bannock and Boise Shoshone. Despite settlers' attempts to appease the Native Americans, the Indians killed nearly the entire migrant party and drove off their livestock. Alexis Van Ornum, his family, and about ten others hid in some nearby brush, only to be discovered and killed. Their bodies were discovered by a company of U.S. soldiers led by Captain Frederick T. Dent. Lieutenant Marcus A. Reno came across the mutilated bodies of six of the Van Ornums. The survivors reported that the attacking warriors took four Van Ornum children captive. As a direct result of this attack, the Army established a military fort near the present location of Boise, Idaho, along the migrant trail. Colonel George Wright requested $150,000 to establish a military post to sustain five troop companies.

Zachias Van Ornum, Alexis' brother, heard from a relative on the Oregon Trail that a small white boy of his missing nephew Reuben's age was being held by a group of Northwestern Shoshone, likely to be in Cache Valley. Van Ornum gathered a small group of friends and traveled to Salt Lake City to get help from the territorial government. There, he visited Col. Connor at Fort Douglas and asked for help to regain his nephew. Col. Connor agreed and sent a detachment of cavalry under the command of Major Edward McGarry to Cache Valley to rendezvous with Van Ornum near the town of Providence, Utah. Van Ornum located a small group of Shoshone warriors being led by Chief Bear Hunter. He and McGarry's men followed the Shoshone as they retreated to nearby Providence Canyon. After the Indians opened fire, McGarry gave the order "to commence firing and to kill every Indian they could see." A skirmish between the Shoshone and the U.S. Army lasted about two hours after the Shoshone established a defensible position in the canyon. Finally, Chief Bear Hunter signaled surrender by climbing a foothill and waving a flag of truce.

Together with about 20 of his people, Chief Bear Hunter was taken prisoner and transported to the soldiers' camp near Providence. When asked about the young white boy, Bear Hunter said that the boy had been sent away a few days earlier. McGarry instructed Bear Hunter to send his people to bring back the white boy. He held Bear Hunter and four warriors hostage. By noon the next day, the Shoshone returned with a small boy who fit the description of Reuben Van Ornum. Zachias Van Ornum claimed the boy was his nephew and took custody, departing to return to Oregon. The Shoshone protested, claiming that the boy was the son of a French fur trapper and the sister of Shoshone chief Washakie. After the federal troops left with Van Ornum and the young boy, McGarry reported to Col. Connor the boy's rescue "without the loss or scratch of man or horse." Bear Hunter complained to the settlers in Cache Valley, arguing they should have helped him against the soldiers. After a confrontation between Bear Hunter, some warriors from his band, and nearly 70 members of the Cache Valley militia, the settlers donated two cows and some flour as the "best and cheapest policy" as compensation.

Bear River crossing 
On December 4, 1862, Connor sent McGarry on another expedition to Cache Valley to recover some stolen livestock from Shoshone. The Shoshone broke camp, fled in advance of the Army troops, and cut the ropes of a ferry at the crossing. McGarry got his men across the river but had to leave their horses behind. Four Shoshone warriors were captured and held for ransom, although they did not appear related to the theft. McGarry ordered that these men would be shot if the stock was not delivered by noon the next day. The Shoshone chiefs moved their people further north into Cache Valley. A firing squad executed the captives and dumped their bodies into the Bear River. In an editorial, the Deseret News expressed concern that the execution would aggravate relations with the Shoshone.

Incident on the Montana Trail 
A.H. Conover, the operator of a Montana Trail freight-hauling service between mining camps of Montana and Salt Lake City, was attacked by Shoshone warriors who killed two men accompanying him: George Clayton and Henry Bean. Arriving in Salt Lake City, Conover told a reporter the Shoshone were "determined to avenge the blood of their comrades" killed by Major McGarry and his soldiers. He said the Shoshone intended to "kill every white man they should meet on the north side of the Bear River, till they should be fully avenged."

Attack on the Montana Trail 
The final catalyst for Connor's expedition was a Shoshone attack on a group of eight miners on the Montana Trail. They had come within  of the central Shoshone winter encampment north of Franklin. The miners missed a turn and ended up mired and lost on the western side of the Bear River, unable to cross the deep river. Three men swam across to Richmond, where they tried to get provisions and a guide from the settlers. Before they returned, the other five men were attacked by Shoshone, who killed John Henry Smith of Walla Walla and some horses. When the Richmond people returned with the advance party, they recovered the body of John Smith and buried him at the Richmond city cemetery.

The surviving miners reached Salt Lake City. William Bevins testified before Chief Justice John F. Kinney and swore an affidavit describing Smith's murder. He also reported that ten miners en route to the city had been murdered three days before Smith. Kinney issued a warrant for the arrest of chiefs Bear Hunter, Sanpitch, and Sagwitch. He ordered the territorial marshal to seek assistance from Col. Connor for a military force to "effect the arrest of the guilty Indians."

Due to such reports, Connor was ready to mount an expedition against the Shoshone. He reported to the U.S. War Department before the engagement:

I have the honor to report that from information received from various sources of the encampment of a large body of Indians on Bear River, in Utah Territory, 140 miles north of this point, who had settlements in this valley to the Beaver Head mines, east of the Rocky Mountains, and being satisfied that they were a part of the same band who had been murdering emigrants on the Overland Mail Route for the last fifteen years, and the principal actors and leaders in the horrid massacres of the past summer, I determined, although the season was unfavorable to an expedition in consequence of the cold weather and deep snow, to chastise them if possible.

Military action in Cache Valley 
In many ways, the soldiers stationed at Fort Douglas were spoiling for a fight. In addition to discipline problems among the soldiers, there was a minor "mutiny" among the soldiers where a joint petition by most of the California Volunteers requested to withhold over $30,000 from their paychecks for the sole purpose of instead paying for naval passage to the eastern states, and to "serve their country in shooting traitors instead of eating rations and freezing to death around sage brush fires...". Furthermore, they said they would gladly pay this money "for the privilege (original emphasis) of going to the Potomac and getting shot." The War Department declined this request.

Throughout most of January 1863, soldiers at Fort Douglas were preparing for a lengthy expedition traveling north to the Shoshone. Connor also wanted to keep the word of his expedition secret, making a surprise attack upon the Shoshone when he arrived. To do this, he separated his command into two detachments that were to come together from time to time on their journey to Cache Valley. His main concern was to avoid the problems that McGarry had faced in the earlier action, where the Shoshone had moved and scattered even before his troops could arrive.

Reaction to this military campaign was mixed. George A. Smith, in the official Journal History of the LDS Church, wrote:

It is said that Col. Connor is determined to exterminate the Indians who have been killing the Emigrants on the route to the Gold Mines in Washington Territory. Small detachments have been leaving for the North for several days. If the present expedition copies the doings of the other that preceded it, it will result in catching some friendly Indians, murdering them, and letting the guilty scamps remain undisturbed in their mountain haunts.

On the other hand, the Deseret News in an editorial, expressed:

...with ordinary good luck, the volunteers will "wipe them out." ....We wish this community rid of all such parties, and if Col. Connor be successful in reaching that bastard class of humans who play with the lives of the peaceable and law-abiding citizens in this way, we shall be pleased to acknowledge our obligations.Deseret News, 28 January 1863, p. 4 

The first group to leave Fort Douglas was forty men of Company K, 3rd Regiment California Volunteer Infantry, commanded by Captain Samuel W. Hoyt, accompanied by 15 baggage wagons and two "mountain howitzers", totaling 80 soldiers. They left on January 22, 1863.

The second group was 220 cavalry, led personally by Connor himself with his aides and 50 men each from Companies A, H, K, and M of the 2nd Regiment of Cavalry, California Volunteers, which left on January 25. As orders specific for this campaign, Connor ordered each soldier to carry "40 rounds of rifle ammunition and 30 rounds of pistol ammunition". This was a total of nearly 16,000 rounds for the campaign. In addition, nearly 200 rounds of artillery shot were brought with the howitzers. As a part of the deception, the cavalry were to travel at night while the infantry moved during the day. Accompanying Connor was the former U.S. Marshal and Mormon scout, Orrin Porter Rockwell.

On the evening of January 28, Captain Hoyt's infantry finally arrived near the town of Franklin, where they spotted three Shoshone who were attempting to get food supplies from the settlers in the town. The Shoshone received nine bushels of wheat in three sacks. William Hull, the settler who was assisting the Shoshone, noted later:

we had two of the three horses loaded, having put three bushels on each horse...when I looked up and saw the Soldiers approaching from the south. I said to the Indian boys, "Here comes the Toquashes (Shoshone for U.S. Soldiers) maybe, you will all be killed. They answered 'maybe the Toquashes will be killed too," but not waiting for the third horse to be loaded, they quickly jumped upon their horses and led the three horses away, disappearing in the distance.

The sacks of grain carried by these Shoshone were later found by the 3rd California Volunteers during their advance the next day, apparently dropped by the Shoshone in their attempt to get back to their camp.

Col. Connor met up with Hoyt that evening as well, with orders to begin moving at about 1:00 am the next morning for a surprise attack, but an attempt to get a local settler to act as a scout for the immediate area led the actual advance to wait until 3:00 am.

This military action occurred during perhaps the coldest time of the year in Cache Valley. Local settlers commented that it was unseasonably cold even for northern Utah, and it may have been as cold as −20 °F (−30 °C) on the morning of the 29th when the attack began. Several soldiers had come down with frostbite and other cold-weather problems, so the 3rd volunteers were at only about 2/3 of their strength compared to when they had left Fort Douglas. Among the rations issued to the soldiers during the campaign was a ration of whiskey held in a canteen; several soldiers noted that this whiskey froze solid on the night before the attack.

Shoshone battle preparations 
It is apparent that the Shoshone chiefs were far from ignorant of the potential for conflict with Col. Connor's soldiers, and some minor preparations were made simultaneously. Most of this involved mainly gathering foodstuffs from surrounding Mormon settlements in a fashion similar to the incident listed above with the residents of Richmond, Utah.

Most of the firearms that the Shoshone had at the time of the attack had been captured in minor skirmishes, traded from fur trappers, white settlers, and other Native American tribal groups, or simply antiques that had been handed down from one generation to another over the years. Their weapons were not as standardized or as well built as the guns issued by the Union Army to the soldiers of the California Volunteers.

Bear Hunter and the other Shoshone chiefs did, however, make some defensive arrangements around their encampment, in addition to simply selecting a generally defensible position in the first place. Willow branches had been woven into makeshift screens, hiding the position and numbers of Shoshone. They also dug a series of "rifle pits" along the eastern bank of Beaver Creek and the Bear River.

At the same time the arrest warrant was issued by Justice Kinney, Chief Sagwitch (named in the warrant) was in Salt Lake City trying to negotiate peace on behalf of the Northwestern Shoshone. A correspondent for the Sacramento Union reported, "The Prophet (Brigham Young) had told Sagwitch the Mormon people had suffered enough from the Shoshoni of Cache Valley and that if more blood were spilled, the Mormons might just "pitch in" and help the troops."

While it appears as though the deception by Connor to hide the numbers of his soldiers involved in the confrontation was successful, the Shoshone were not even then anticipating a direct military engagement with these soldiers. Instead, they were preparing for a negotiated settlement where the chiefs would be able to talk with officers of the U.S. Army and try to come to an understanding.

Massacre 
Major McGarry and the first cavalry units of the 2nd Regiment California Volunteer Cavalry arrived at the massacre scene at 6:00 am, just as dawn broke over the mountains. Due to the weather conditions and deep snow, it took time for Connor to organize his soldiers into a battle line. The artillery never arrived as they got caught in a snow drift  from the Shoshone encampment.

Chief Sagwitch noted the approach of the American soldiers, saying just before the first shots were fired, 
 
Look like there is something up on the ridge up there. Look like a cloud. Maybe it is a steam come from a horse. Maybe that's them soldiers they were talking about.

Initially, Connor tried a direct frontal offensive against the Shoshone positions but was soon overwhelmed with return gunfire from the Shoshone. The California Volunteers suffered most of their direct combat-related casualties during this first assault.

After temporarily retreating and regrouping, Connor sent McGarry and several other smaller groups into flanking maneuvers to attack the village from the sides and behind. He directed a line of infantry to block any attempt by the Shoshone to flee from the attack. After about two hours, the Shoshone had run out of ammunition. According to some later reports, some Shoshone were seen trying to cast lead ammunition during the middle of the battle and died with the molds in their hands. Bear Hunter was killed, with some later reporting that he had been among those casting bullets; Madsen described the possibility as "doubtful".

Casualties and immediate aftermath 
The California Volunteers suffered 14 soldiers killed and 49 wounded, 7 mortally. After the officers concluded the battle was over, they returned with the soldiers to their temporary encampment near Franklin. Franklin residents opened their homes to wounded soldiers that night. They brought blankets and hay to the church meetinghouse to protect the other soldiers from the cold. Connor hired several men to use sleighs to bring wounded men back to Salt Lake City.

Connor estimated his forces killed more than 224 out of 300 warriors. He reported capturing 175 horses and some arms, and destroying 70 lodges and a large quantity of stored wheat in winter supplies. He left a small quantity of wheat on the field for the 160 captured women and children.

The death toll was large, but some Shoshone survived. Chief Sagwitch gathered survivors to keep his community alive. Sagwitch was shot twice in the hand and tried to escape on horseback, only to have the horse shot out from under him. He went to the ravine and escaped into the Bear River near a hot spring, where he floated under some brush until nightfall. Sagwitch's son, Beshup Timbimboo, was shot seven times but survived and was rescued by family members. Other band members hid in the willow brush of the Bear River or tried to act as if they were dead. Sagwitch and other survivors retrieved the wounded and built a fire to warm the survivors.

There was a large difference between the number of Indians reported killed by Connor and the number counted by the citizens of Franklin, the latter being much larger. The settlers also claimed the number of surviving women and children to be much fewer than what Connor claimed. In his 1911 autobiography, Danish immigrant Hans Jasperson claims to have walked among the bodies and counted 493 dead Shoshone.
In 1918, Sagwitch's son Be-shup, Frank Timbimboo Warner, said, "[H]alf of those present got away," and 156 were killed. He went on to say that two of his brothers and a sister-in-law "lived", as well as many who later lived at the Washakie, Utah, settlement, the Fort Hall reservation, in the Wind River country, and elsewhere.

Based on a variety of sources, Brigham D. Madsen estimates about 250 were killed in the definitive history of the massacre.

Effects on settlement of Cache Valley and long-term consequences 
This conflict marked the final significant influence of the Shoshone nation upon Cache Valley and its immediate surroundings. In addition to opening the northern part of Cache Valley to Mormon settlement, Cache Valley also offered a staging area for additional settlements in southeastern Idaho. Friction between the Mormons and Col. Connor continued for many more years with accusations of harassment of non-Mormons in the Utah Territory and criticisms by Mormons of Connor's attempts to begin a mining industry in Utah.

Chief Sagwitch and many members of his band allied with the Mormons. Many were baptized and joined the LDS Church. Sagwitch was ordained as an Elder in the Melchizedek priesthood. Members of this band helped to establish the town of Washakie, Utah, named in honor of the Shoshone chief. Most of the remaining members of the Northwestern band of Shoshone built farms and homesteads under LDS Church sponsorship. Their descendants became largely integrated into mainstream LDS society. The Shoshone who were not involved with this settlement went to the Fort Hall Indian Reservation or the Wind River Indian Reservation.

According to published newspaper articles, Col. Connor and the California Volunteers were treated as heroes when they arrived at Fort Douglas and by their community in California. Connor was promoted to the permanent rank of brigadier general and given a brevet promotion shortly afterward to the rank of major general. Connor campaigned against Native Americans in the West for the remainder of the U.S. Civil War, leading the Powder River Expedition against the Sioux and Cheyenne.

Memorials and legacy 

The Bear River Massacre Site is located near U.S. Route 91. The site was designated a National Historic Landmark in 1990. The Northwestern Band of the Shoshone Nation acquired the site in 2018 to protect it as a sacred burial ground. They intend to erect a monument in memory of the massacre's victims.

The Smithsonian Institution repatriated two Shoshone human remains, that of a teenage man and a woman who was in her 20s when she was killed, back to the Shoshone people for burial. The remains were returned in 2013.

Further reading

Notes

References

Sources 
Christensen, Scott R.; Sagwitch: Shoshone Chieftain, Mormon Elder (1822–1887); Logan, Utah; Utah State University Press; 1999; 
Bear Hunter Bear Hunter (U.S. National Park Service) National Park Service
Franklin County Historical Society (Idaho); "The passing of the redman, being a succinct account of the last battle that wrested Idaho from the bondage of the Indians"; [Preston? Id.] Franklin County Historical Society and Monument Committee. [1917], Archive.org
Hart, Newell; The Bear River Massacre; Preston, Idaho; Cache Valley Newsletter Publishing Company; 1982; 
Madsen, Brigham D.; Glory Hunter: A Biography of Patrick Edward Connor; Salt Lake City, Utah; University of Utah Press; 1990; 
Madsen, Brigham D.; The Northern Shoshoni; Caldwell, ID; Caxton Printers Ltd.; 1980; 
Madsen, Brigham D.; The Shoshoni Frontier and the Bear River Massacre; Salt Lake City, Utah; University of Utah Press; 1985; 
Miller, Rod.; Massacre at Bear River; Caldwell, ID; Caxton Press: 2008; 
Moore, Frank; The Rebellion Record; New York; G.P. Putnam; 1868; 
Orton, Richard H.; Records of California Men in the War of Rebellion; Sacramento, California; State Office; 1890; 

Simmonds, A.J.; In God's Lap: Cache Valley History as told in the newspaper columns of A.J. Simmonds; Logan, Utah; The Herald Journal; 2004; 
Ricks, Joel E. (editor); The History of a Valley: Cache Valley, Utah-Idaho; Logan, Utah; Cache Valley Centennial Commission; 1956
Bancroft, Hubert Howe; History of Utah, 1540–1886; (reproduction) Las Vegas, Nevada; Nevada Publications; 
Varley, James F.; Brigham and the Brigadier: General Patrick Connor and His California Volunteers in Utah and Along the Overland Trail; Tucson, Arizona; Westernlore Press; 1989; 
Madsen, Brigham D.; Chief Pocatello; Moscow, Idaho; University of Idaho Press; 1986; 
Reid, Kenneth C. (ed.) Approaching Bear River: Historic, Geomorphic, and Archaeological Investigations at the Bear River Massacre National Historic Landmark. Monographs in Idaho Archaeology and Ethnology No. 3. Idaho State Historical Society, State Historic Preservation Office, 2017.
Shannon, David H.; The Utter Disaster on the Oregon Trail: The Utter and Van Ornum Massacres of 1860; Caldwell, ID; Snake Country Publishing; 1993; 

MultimediaThe Bear River Massacre (2000); producers: Michael Mill, Chris Dallin, and Richard James; Imagic Entertainment; 66 min.The House of the Lord: Cache Valley and the Logan Temple (2003); producer: Dennis Lyman; Temple Hill Videos; 60 min.

 External links 

FranklinIdaho.org, An Early History of Franklin
OHS.org, Zacheas Van Ornum Petition for Indemnity
OHS.org News Article, Snake River Massacre Account by One of the Survivors
Everything2, Everything2.com, node about the Bear River Massacre
Jessie L. Bonner, "Tribe marks massacre with burial ground gathering", Indian Country Today'', February 12, 2010

1863 in Washington Territory
Massacres in 1863
Bear River (Great Salt Lake)
Conflicts in 1863
Ethnic cleansing in the United States
Franklin County, Idaho
Idaho in the American Civil War
Indian wars of the American Old West
January 1863 events
Massacres of Native Americans
Mormonism and Native Americans
Mormonism-related controversies
Native American genocide
Shoshone
The Church of Jesus Christ of Latter-day Saints in Idaho
Massacres committed by the United States
Utah in the American Civil War
Native American history of Idaho
Native American history of Utah